Henry Fisher Menzies (15 June 1867 in London, Ontario, Canada – 31 July 1938 in Edinburgh) was a Scottish rugby player.

His debut was on 4 February 1893 against Wales.

External links
Scrum.com

1867 births
1938 deaths
Canadian people of Scottish descent
Canadian rugby union players
Scotland international rugby union players
Scottish rugby union players
Sportspeople from London, Ontario